Bearstone is a hamlet in Shropshire, England. For population details as taken at the 2011 census see Woore (Shropshire).

Villages in Shropshire